Dong Hua Sao National Protected Area is a national protected area in Champasak Province in southern Laos. This forested park rises from the Mekong river lowlands eastwards into the Bolaven Plateau. It is an ecotourism destination.

Geography
The park's area is  including  of wetlands.

History
Coffee growing was introduced to this area in the 1940s. In 1950 the Dong Hua Sao Forest Reserve was declared, covering . Wartime migration of ethnic minorities from highland to lowland areas took place in the 1960s and 1970s. In the 1980s there was extensive logging in the area, some to establish coffee plantations.

Flora and fauna
The park's main forest type is semidry evergreen forest. Upland forest is considered moist evergreen forest.

Animal species include the endangered yellow-cheeked gibbon. Wild elephants once roamed the area, but now only domesticated ones are found. Bird life includes the grey-faced tit-babbler, found only in Indochina, and rare hornbills. The wetlands are home to the Siamese crocodile, hog deer and green peafowl, all endangered.

Threats
Dong Hua Sao faces a number of environmental threats. The most significant is forest conversion for coffee plantations. Other threats include destructive fishing practices, hunting, overcollection of forest products and use of wetlands for agriculture and fisheries. The crocodiles of the wetlands face threats to their prey base from hunting and fishing.

See also
Protected areas of Laos

References

National Biodiversity Conservation Areas
Protected areas established in 1993
Geography of Champasak province